Hannah Stockbauer (born 7 January 1982) is a World Champion, Olympic and national-record holding swimmer from Germany. In 2003, she was named the female World Swimmer of the Year by Swimming World Magazine, following her winning the 400, 800 and 1500 freestyles at the 2003 World Championships.

She swam for Germany at the:
Olympics: 2000, 2004
World Championships: 2001, 2003
European Championships: 1999, 2002
Short Course Europeans: 1998, 2002

At the 2001 World Championships, she won the 800 and 1500 frees.

At the 2003 World Championships, she was named Female Swimmer of the Meet, after she won 3 events (400, 800 and 1500 frees), setting meet records in the 800 and 1500 (8:23.66 and 16:00.18) and the German Record in the 1500.

At the 2004 Olympics, she was part of the Germany relay that won a bronze medal in the  Free Relay.

She retired from competition in October 2005.

References

1982 births
Living people
German female swimmers
Sportspeople from Nuremberg
Olympic swimmers of Germany
Swimmers at the 2000 Summer Olympics
Swimmers at the 2004 Summer Olympics
Olympic bronze medalists for Germany
Olympic bronze medalists in swimming
German female freestyle swimmers
World Aquatics Championships medalists in swimming
European Aquatics Championships medalists in swimming
Medalists at the 2004 Summer Olympics
20th-century German women
21st-century German women